Dan Skipper (born September 20, 1994) is an American football offensive tackle for the Detroit Lions of the National Football League (NFL). He played college football at Arkansas.

High school career
Skipper was born in Arvada, Colorado, a suburb of Denver. He played football at Ralston Valley High School, where he earned 5A all-state recognition as a senior. During his senior season, he helped get Ralston Valley to the state semifinals. Skipper received numerous scholarship offers, ultimately choosing the University of Arkansas.

College career
As a freshman, Skipper played in all twelve of the Razorbacks' games, starting eight. He blocked three field goal attempts, a school single-season record. He was named a Consensus All-American. As a sophomore, Skipper started all 13 games of the season and earned an Associated Press All-SEC honorable mention. As a junior, he started all 13 games and was named to ESPN's All-SEC team. As a senior, he made the All-SEC team of ESPN, Phil Steele, Athlon Sports, Lindy's Sports, Sporting News, and the Coaches Poll.

Professional career

Skipper went undrafted during the 2017 NFL Draft. It was speculated that he went undrafted due to a chronic blood condition that was discovered during prospect evaluations. After not receiving a contract as an undrafted free agent, Skipper received an invitation to attend the Dallas Cowboys' rookie mini camp as a tryout candidate.

Dallas Cowboys
On May 16, 2017, the Dallas Cowboys signed Skipper as an undrafted free agent.

Throughout training camp, he competed for a roster spot against Emmett Cleary, Clay DeBord, Ruben Carter, and Kadeem Edwards. On September 2, 2017, he was waived by the Cowboys and was signed to the practice squad the next day. He was released on September 20, 2017.

Detroit Lions
On September 25, 2017, Skipper was signed to the Detroit Lions' practice squad. He was promoted to the active roster on October 26, 2017. On October 31, 2017, he was waived in order for the Lions to sign Don Barclay and was re-signed to the practice squad. He signed a reserve/future contract with the Lions on January 1, 2018.

On September 1, 2018, Skipper was waived by the Lions and was signed to the practice squad the next day. He was released on September 5, 2018.

Denver Broncos
On November 27, 2018, Skipper was signed to the Denver Broncos practice squad.

New England Patriots
On January 8, 2019, Skipper was signed to the New England Patriots practice squad. Skipper was a part of the Patriots Super Bowl LIII championship team when they defeated the Los Angeles Rams 13-3. He signed a reserve/future contract with the Patriots on February 5, 2019. He was released during final roster cuts on August 31, 2019. He was signed to the practice squad the next day.

Houston Texans
On October 16, 2019, Skipper was signed by the Houston Texans off the Patriots practice squad. He was waived on November 11, 2019.

Detroit Lions (second stint)
On November 12, 2019, Skipper was claimed off waivers by the Detroit Lions. He was waived on November 22 and re-signed to the practice squad. He was promoted to the active roster on December 14, 2019.

Skipper was waived/injured by the Lions during final roster cuts on September 5, 2020, and subsequently reverted to the team's injured reserve list the next day. He was waived with an injury settlement on September 14. He was re-signed to the Lions practice squad on October 21, 2020. He was elevated to the active roster on November 14 and December 12 for the team's weeks 10 and 14 games against the Washington Football Team and Green Bay Packers, and reverted to the practice squad after each game. On December 19, 2020, Skipper was promoted to the active roster. For the team's week 17 game against the Minnesota Vikings, Skipper played 9 downs at defensive tackle.

On August 30, 2021, Skipper was waived/injured by the Lions and placed on injured reserve. He was released on September 6, 2021.

Las Vegas Raiders
On October 13, 2021, Skipper was signed to the Las Vegas Raiders practice squad. He was released on November 3.

Detroit Lions (third stint)
On November 19, 2021, Skipper was signed to the Detroit Lions practice squad. He signed a reserve/future contract with the Lions on January 10, 2022.

On August 30, 2022, Skipper was released by the Lions and signed to the practice squad the next day. This was an emotional moment for the HBO show, Hard Knocks, when Skipper asked "What could I have done different?". On September 18, 2022, in a week 2 matchup versus the Washington Commanders, Skipper got his first career start at guard, a position he had not played since Freshman year in college. In his post game speech, Head Coach Dan Campbell specifically called out "Skip" for his stepping up in their time of need after the 36-27 win over the Commanders.  The media and Lions fans everywhere gravitated to his underdog story. He was signed to the active roster on October 1.

References

External links
 
 Arkansas Razorbacks football bio

1994 births
Living people
American football offensive tackles
Arkansas Razorbacks football players
Dallas Cowboys players
Detroit Lions players
Denver Broncos players
Houston Texans players
Las Vegas Raiders players
New England Patriots players
People from Arvada, Colorado
Players of American football from Colorado
Sportspeople from the Denver metropolitan area